Denise Eugenia Dresser Guerra (born 22 January 1963) is a Mexican writer, and university professor. She is currently a faculty member of the Department of Political Science at the Instituto Tecnológico Autónomo de México, columnist in Proceso magazine, editorial writer for the newspaper Reforma, and participates in "La Hora De Opinar" TV Forum. She was awarded the Legion of Honor of the French Republic in the rank of Knight, the highest distinction awarded by the French government to citizens and foreigners, for her defense of freedom of expression and human rights. She has been named by Forbes magazine as one of the most powerful women in Mexico and one of the 50 most influential women in Twitter.

Career 
Denise Dresser has a degree in international relations at El Colegio de México, and master's and doctorate in political science at Princeton University. She is a specialist in political science and is a professor at the prívate college Instituto Tecnológico Autónomo de México where she has taught courses on contemporary Mexican politics and comparative politics since 1991. She is the author of numerous articles about contemporary Mexican politics and relations between Mexico-United States. In 2009 she won the National Journalism Award in the category of Best feature article with "Open letter to Carlos Slim", along with journalist Carmen Aristegui and writer Carlos Monsiváis, the award is presented annually by the City Council of National Award Journalism "under the premises of autonomy, independence, impartiality, plurality and responsibility".

She has been a visiting researcher at the Center for US-Mexico University of California, San Diego, Center for International Studies at the University of Southern California, in the Inter-American Dialogue in Washington DC, a visiting professor at the University of California, Berkeley and at Georgetown University. She has received research grants from the Fulbright Commission, the OAS, Princeton University and the Rockefeller Foundation. Some fragments of her texts were included by playwright Humberto Robles in the documentary Women of sand, text addressing femicide in Ciudad Juarez, this as a result of women involved in drug and arms trafficking cartels during the administration of Felipe Calderón Hinojosa.

She was a member of the Committee to Support the Special Prosecutor for Past Social and Political Advisor and the Human Rights Commission of the Mexico City movements. She is a founding member of the Mexican Association of the Right to Information and the Citizens Coalition "Defend the Forest and the City."

As a journalist, Dresser writes a column in the newspaper Reforma and the weekly Proceso. She has published in the newspaper La Opinion in Los Angeles, Los Angeles Times and The New York Times. She has been commentator and host of the news program Detrás de la noticia and a host of Entre versiones in Channel 40. She participated in other television shows like El cristal con que se mira of Victor Trujillo. She has also been policy analyst in the politics table of Radio Monitor with Jose Gutierrez Vivo. She was a weekly commentator on W Radio. Until 2015, she participated in the politics table with Carmen Aristegui. She anchored El país de uno in CONACULTA Channel 22.

In 2011 she participated expressing an opinion on the film De panzazo, where she talks about the education in Mexico. She is coordinator of the book Cries and Whispers: Untimely experiences of 38 women and produced the television series of the book. She is also the coordinator of Cries and Whispers II: Untimely experiences of 39 other women. She wrote, in collaboration with the novelist Jorge Volpi, Mexico: what every citizen would want (not) to know about his homeland, a satirical vision of the Mexican political system. Aguilar published her book Our country: reflections to understand and change Mexico, in which she proposed her ideas based on ten points to transform the country.

She has expressed an open opposition to monopolistic practices in Mexico, especially against the so-called Televisa Law, which, in her opinion, favors the television duopoly of Televisa and TV Azteca, and against Carlos Slim, the world's richest and most powerful magnate in the country who owns almost all the Mexican telephone network (TELMEX). 

She is the granddaughter of American track and field athlete and managing director of General Motors in Mexico Ivan Dresser. Denise has three children.

References

External links

 Denise Dresser -  Official website
 Dresser y Volpi - " México: lo que todo ciudadano (no) quisiera saber sobre su patria" Official website
 Brief biography -  Brief biography

El Colegio de México alumni
Academic staff of the Instituto Tecnológico Autónomo de México
Living people
Mexican people of American descent
Mexican people of German descent
Mexican television talk show hosts
Mexican women writers
Princeton University alumni
1963 births
Mexican columnists
Writers from Mexico City
Mexican women columnists